Westwood Cemetery can refer to:

 Westwood Cemetery (Michigan) - Kalkaska County, Michigan
 Westwood Cemetery (Westwood, California) - Westwood, Lassen, California
 Westwood Village Memorial Park Cemetery - Cemetery to the Stars in the Westwood Village area of Los Angeles, California